Sepuluh Nopember Institute of Technology ('10th of November Institute of Technology'; abbreviated as ITS) is an Indonesian public technological university located in Surabaya, East Java, with a strong emphasis on scientific, engineering, and vocational education system. Located on 180-hectares green area, ITS is home to more than 1,000 faculty members and over 20,000 undergraduate and graduate students.

ITS is ranked 1st in Indonesia and 64th in the world based on the Times Higher Education (THE) Impact Ranking 2021, which reflects to its strong commitment to support the UN's Sustainable Development Goals under the comprehensive platform of ITS Smart Eco Campus. From the Widya Wahana Project, Indonesia's first solar-powered car, to the Jalapatih Project, Indonesia's first solar-powered ship, ITS is growing as a national powerhouse for green technology and pioneering clean energy innovation in Indonesia, the largest Muslim-populated country in the world. The institute launched and operated Indonesia's first electric bus in 2014 and Indonesia's first teaching industry in automotive (GESITS) that produces electric scooter for national commercial market in 2017 in order to transform Indonesia's fossil-based transportation fuel into the sustainable green technology. The continuous inclusion of student activism in its curriculum has been substantial for making ITS the most impactful university in Indonesia; social engagement in solving environmental issues through national or international competition is formally rewarded in a credit-based evaluation system as part of its integrated character-building curriculum.   
   
The Indonesian second-oldest public technological institute covers 33 undergraduate programs, six vocational study programs, 20 master programs, 15 doctoral programs, and 20 International Undergraduate Programs (IUP). The institute has established seven programs with international accreditation (IABEE and ABET) and 16 programs with the AUN-QA international certification, with more than 360 international partner-institutions in 52 countries. ITS has been expanding its educational disciplines beyond sciences and engineering into fields such as arts, business management, and development studies. With two Indonesian best polytechnics, Electronic State Polytechnic (PENS) and Shipbuilding State Polytechnic (PPNS), operate independently in the same area as ITS' main campus in Sukolilo, ITS has been continuously transforming the City of Surabaya as a national powerhouse for advanced technological innovation, impactful scientific and engineering research, and best vocational education.

History

Early years (20th Century)
ITS was founded as an humble technical college on November 10, 1957. In its early years, Angka Nitisastro, a medical doctor who became the first Rector of ITS, announced the student registration from his clinic. Following the suggestion of Indonesian Foreign Minister Ruslan Abdulgani (1914-2005), the establishment charter of ITS was signed by Sukarno (1901-1970), the first President of Republic of Indonesia. Both of them were born in Surabaya, which shared emotional connection with the city. In his speech, President Sukarno emphasized on the Spirit of Sepuluh Nopember, which refers to the legendary heroes who fought against colonialism and imperialism in the Battle of Surabaya on November 10, 1945, and annually being commemorated as Heroes Day in Indonesia. Initially, the small Sepuluh Nopember Technical College had only two departments, Civil Engineering and Mechanical Engineering. Three years later, ITS expanded by opening Electronic Engineering, Naval Architecture and Shipbuilding Engineering, and Chemical Engineering departments.

In 1965, ITS developed two more faculties, Architectural Engineering and the Faculty of Natural Sciences. In 1965, despite of socio-political crises in Indonesia, ITS had established seven faculties: Faculty of Civil Engineering, Faculty of Mechanical Engineering, Faculty of Chemical Engineering, Faculty of Electrical Engineering, Faculty of Naval Architecture and Shipbuilding Engineering, and Faculty of Natural Science. In 1972, the campus of the Faculty of Civil Engineering was relocated to Jl. Manyar 8 Surabaya; the ITS campuses was separated. In the late of 1975, the Faculty of Architectural Engineering and Faculty of Natural Science were relocated to Jl. Cokroaminoto 12A, Surabaya. With financial aid from ADB, ITS started to build a large educational complex in eastern Surabaya, 1977.

In the early 1980s, reorganization took place in ITS, and the former faculties were downgraded into departments and merged into common discipline faculties. Hence the new ITS organization comprises four faculties: the Faculty of Mathematics and Natural Sciences, Faculty of Industrial Technology, Faculty of Civil Engineering and Planning, and the Faculty of Marine Technology. In 1988, ITS established its first polytechnic branch, Shipbuilding Polytechnic of Surabaya. This was followed by the second, Electronic Engineering Polytechnic of Surabaya.

New Development (21st Century) 
In 2001, as a response to the visionary speech of President Abdurrahman Wahid in front of the faculties, ITS introduced a faculty of information technology consisting of two departments: Informatics Engineering and Information Systems. Two Indonesian leading polytechnics; Electronic State Polytechnic (PENS) and Shipbuilding State Polytechnic (PPNS) now operate independently on the same area at ITS' main campus in Sukolilo, a region in the eastern part of the City of Surabaya, East Java, that serves as a national center for advanced technological innovation in robotics and artificial intelligence, shipbuilding and marine engineering, clean and renewable energy, and smart city.    

Today, ITS has three campus areas: Cokroaminoto, Manyar, and Sukolilo as the largest educational complex. In 2013, as a technological institute founded by a medical doctor, Angka Nitisastro, ITS marks its engagement to the advanced medical research by graduating its first doctoral graduate on medical engineering, Ingrid Nurtanio, lecturer at University of Hassanuddin. Muhammad Nuh initiated Indonesia's first undergraduate program Biomedical Engineering in 2007, which historically reconnect ITS to its early years when the newly born institute was led by a medical doctor, Angka Nitisastro.

Campuses

Virtual Tour 
Within its website, Institut Teknologi Surabaya provides an ITS virtual tour to give insight for public to explore each of departments, facilities, and innovation building. Moreover, the course structures and career projects are depicted as detail information.

Location 

ITS is located in the City of Surabaya, the second-largest city in Indonesia.
ITS operates three campuses in Surabaya. Its main campus is located at Sukolilo, wherein all undergraduate programs are delivered, along with the postgraduate buildings, administrative building, main library, faculties housing, student community center, central cafeteria, football stadium, jogging track, and student dormitory that can accommodate 1200 freshmen. A smaller campus is located in Manyar district, providing a Civil Engineering diploma course. The third campus is located at Cokroaminoto Street, providing a postgraduate Technology Management Magister course.

Cafeteria 
A central canteen and numerous smaller canteens can be found in ITS main campus at Sukolilo. Some small-sized canteens are serving students, faculty members, and staff in several departments. A central canteen (Indonesian: Kantin Pusat ITS), the largest in the campus, is offering different counters with diverse foods and beverages in an affordable price. Famous for its affordable and diverse menu, it is not uncommon to see some influential and famous alumni or even students and visitors from other universities enjoying foods in the central canteen.

Academic facilities and campus life
December 14, 2010, President Dr. Susilo Bambang Yudhoyono officially signed the establishment of the Robotics Center Building (Gedung Pusat Robotika) in ITS' campus, Sukolilo, the Indonesian largest technological center for robotics and AI's research. Overall, ITS operates academic facilities on a land area of 187 hectares. ITS hosts graduation ceremony twice in an academic year in a main hall with a capacity of 4,000 occupants. Sport facilities can be found on the campus: a stadium and football ground, futsal courts, basketball courts, tennis courts, wall climbing, gymnasium and indoor badminton courts, rafting canal and jogging tracks.

Faculties and departments 
There are 7 faculties and 1 school, some departments offer diploma programs.

In early 2016 the Department of Industrial Engineering achieved ABET accreditation. In early 2015 the Department of Informatics, Department of Statistics and Department of Environmental Engineering also achieved AUN accreditation.

Research and achievements 
ITS is well known for the systematic inclusion of student activism in its methodical curriculum; practical engagement in socio-technological activity is formally rewarded through its credit-based evaluation system as part of its character-building curriculum. Within this unique system, undergraduate student must pass the minimum numbers of required credit of social engagement in order to graduate from the institute. Undergraduate students are supervised by selected faculty members in technological project that deals with environmental or social issues for local, national, or international scale. Involvement in national and international competition are encouraged in order to integrate in-class learning and out-of-class impact. ITS is famous for its winning-spirit ethos, as students, led and supervised by selected faculty members, are tirelessly competing in national and international level.

Naval architecture
ITS launched Indonesia's first solar-powered ship, and took part in a world competition, Dong Energy Challenge, in 2014 in the Netherlands. In 2012, ITS participated in the Atlantic Challenge at Bantry, Ireland, and won The Spirit of Atlantic Challenge.

Robotic engineering
In 2012, a team of students was given the Toyota Award at the ABU Asia-Pacific Robot Contest (ABU Robocon) in Hong Kong. Two years later, a team of students was given the Second Runner Up and Best Engineering Award at the ABU Asia-Pacific Robot Contest (ABU Robocon) in Pune, India. In 2016, a team of students (ICHIRO) was given 10 medals at 21st FIRA Hurocup in Beijing, China. In the same year, a team of students (Barunastra) was given The Second Runner Up and  Best Speed and Maneuverability at 9TH Annual International RoboBoat Competition - AUVSI Foundation in Virginia, USA. A year later, a team of students (ICHIRO) was given 14 medals at 22nd FIRA Hurocup in Kaohsiung, Taiwan.

Concept car

ITS launched Indonesia's first solar-powered car, Widya Wahana. It was tested in Australia, in a world solar car competition. In 2012, the urban energy-efficient concept car, Sapu Angin, won the Asia Pacific energy-saving car competition, Shell Eco Marathon Asia 2012, at Sepang, Malaysia. A year later, ITS (Sapu Angin Speed) won the Best Rookie Award of ICV at Student Formula Japan. Additionally, ITS won the Shell Helix Tribology Award (off-track award) at Shell Eco-Marathon Asia 2013. In the same year, Spectronic VI from ITS won first place among presentation posters and third place in competition at the Chem-e-car Competition in Chemeca 2013, in Brisbane, Australia. 2015, ITS won the Shell Eco Marathon (SEM) Asia 2015, in Manila, the Philippines, in the urban concept diesel category.

Electric vehicles 
The institute launched and operated Indonesia's first electric bus in 2014 and Indonesia's first teaching industry (Gesits Project) that produces electric scooter for national commercial market in 2017 in order to transform Indonesia's fossil-based transportation fuel into the green technology.

Research

Research and Society Service Centre (LPPM)
Environmental Centre
Energy Centre
Earth and Disaster Mitigation Centre
Marine Centre
Industrial Centre
IT & Multimedia Communication Centre
Continuing Education Unit
Intellectual Property Rights Unit
RIMA-ITS (Research Institute For Web and Mobile Application - ITS)
Laboratory for Housing and Human Settlements
Robotic Research Centre

Ranking

The QS Asia University Rangkings 2022 has ranked Institut Teknologi Sepuluh Nopember (ITS Surabaya) as number 160. In 2023, ITS was ranked 701-750 worldwide according to the Top QS World University Rankings 2023, as well as ranked 160th in the Top QS Asian University Rankings 2022 (sixth  in Indonesia after Gadjah Mada University, Bandung Institute of Technology, University of Indonesia, Airlangga University and Bogor Agricultural University).

Student activities
ITS is well known for its winning-spirit ethos in sport.  In 2015, Seaborg ITS's team won first place at College Bowl 2015, the largest football league held by Indonesian Flag Football Association (IFFA). Maritime Challenge ITS's team won first place at Atlantic Challenge International (ACI) 2014 in the Oar and Sail category, in France.

ITS has a variety of student organizations involved in politic, religion, sports, the arts, and other activities. These include:
Student Executive Organization
Student Legislative
Manarul 'Ilmi Masjid Members
PLH Siklus ITS, students' environmental organization
ITS Students Choir
ITS Foreign Language Society (IFLS)
CLICK ITS, students' film and cinematography organization
ITS Radio
Pramuka ITS
"Tiyang Alit" Theatre
"Dr Angka" students cooperative
Workshop of Entrepreneurship & Technology (WE&T-ITS)
Maritime Challenge
Loedroek ITS - traditional East Java play, converted to a more modern and contemporary style
ITS Muay Thai Association

Notable alumni
Tri Rismaharini, Minister of Social Affairs of the Republic of Indonesia (2020–present); graduated from the Department of Architecture.
Muhammad Nuh, Minister of Education and Culture of the Republic of Indonesia (2009 – 2014); graduated from the Department of Electrical Engineering.
Agus Rahardjo, Head of the Corruption Eradication Commission (2015 – 2019); graduated from the Department of Civil Engineering.
Nova Iriansyah, Governor of Aceh (2020–present); graduated from the Department of Architecture.
Eri Cahyadi, Mayor of Surabaya (2021–present); graduated from the Department of Civil Engineering.
Vandiko Gultom, Regent of Samosir (2021–present); graduated from the Department of Civil Engineering.
Putri Raemawasti, journalist and Miss Universe Indonesia 2008 (Puteri Indonesia 2007); went to the Department of Industrial Engineering.

Dropped out 
Susilo Bambang Yudhoyono, President of the Republic of Indonesia (2004 - 2014) and songwriter; dropped out of the Department of Mechanical Engineering.
Gombloh, folk singer-songwriter; dropped out of the Department of Architecture. 
Leo Kristi, folk singer-songwriter; dropped out of the Department of Architecture.
Jonas Rivanno Wattimena, actor and singer; dropped out of the Department of Environmental Engineering.

References

External links

Official website (Indonesian)
Official website (English)

Educational institutions established in 1957
Educational institutions in Surabaya
Sepuluh Nopember Institute of Technology
Indonesian state universities
1957 establishments in Indonesia